Gentinos was a town in ancient Troad. The inhabitants of Gentinos are cited in the tribute records of Athens between the years 452/1 and 444/3 BCE, so the city was part of the Delian League. Gentinos minted bronze coins inscribed «ΓΕΝ» or «ΓΕΝΤΙ».

Its site is tentatively located near Ballı Dağ, Asiatic Turkey.

References

Populated places in ancient Troad
Former populated places in Turkey
Members of the Delian League